Gunfire is a 1950 American Western film directed by William Berke.

It was also known as Frank James Rides Again.

Plot
Frank James' plans at a quiet life are threatened by the arrival of a lookalike.

Cast
Don Barry as Frank James
Robert Lowery as Sheriff John Kelly
Wally Vernon as Clem
Pamela Blake as Cynthy
Leonard Penn as Dan Simons
Steve Pendleton as Charlie Ford
Tommy Farrell as Lerner
Dean Riesner as Outlaw Mack
Steve Conte as Matt Riley
William Bailey as Second Sheriff

References

External links

Gunfire at BFI

1950 films
American Western (genre) films
1950s English-language films
Films directed by William A. Berke
1950 Western (genre) films
Lippert Pictures films
American black-and-white films
1950s American films